Alakamisy may refer to either to the following towns in central Madagascar:

  Alakamisy, Antananarivo - a village in  Analamanga, Madagascar.
 Alakamisy, Antsirabe II - a village in Antsirabe II District,  Vakinankaratra, Madagascar
 Alakamisy, Fianarantsoa  - a village in Haute Matsiatra, Madagascar.
 Alakamisy Marososona in Vakinankaratra, Madagascar.
 Alakamisy Anativato in Vakinankaratra, Madagascar.
 Alakamisy Itenina - a village in Haute Matsiatra, Madagascar.
 Alakamisy Ambohimaha - a village in  Haute Matsiatra, Madagascar.
 Alakamisy Ambohimahazo a village in  Amoron'i Mania Region, Madagascar.

*